Kukuri was produced and edited by Philippe Talavera, Director and founder of Ombetja Yehinga Organisation (OYO) Trust. It was nominated at the 7th Africa Magic Viewers Choice Awards for Best Movie Southern Africa. The producer, OYO, conducted a survey on child marriage and the team conducted an anonymous interview on girls in the north who had been forced to marry at an early age.

Synopsis 
The film follows a young girl from the Kavango region who dreams of becoming a lawyer. Her dreams get shattered when her grand-mother starts plotting to get her married to the local brick-layer.

Cast 

 Hanty Kashongo
 George Antonio
 Mbango Munyima
 Renah Xuexom
 Nangana Mushavanga
 Diyanna Longwani
 Christiaan Haingura Njamba
 Rozalina Wanga.

References